Rüppell's weaver (Ploceus galbula) is a species of bird in the family Ploceidae, which is native to the northern Afrotropics. The species is named after the German zoologist and explorer Eduard Rüppell (1794–1884).

Range
It is found from Sudan to Somalia and extreme northern Kenya. It is also found in the south-western Arabian Peninsula.

Habitat
In the mountains of Degua Tembien in north Ethiopia, it can be observed in bushy and shrubby areas.

Gallery

References

External links
 Ruppell's Weaver -  Species text in Weaver Watch.

Rüppell's weaver
Birds of the Horn of Africa
Birds of the Arabian Peninsula
Rüppell's weaver
Taxonomy articles created by Polbot